The men's 4×100 metre medley relay event at the 1960 Olympic Games took place on August 27 (qualification) and September 1 (final). This swimming event used medley swimming as a relay. Because an Olympic size swimming pool is 50 metres long, each of the four swimmers completed two lengths of the pool, each using a different stroke. The first on each team used the backstroke, the second used the breaststroke, the third used the butterfly stroke, and the final swimmer used freestyle (restricted to not allow any of the first three strokes to be used, though nearly all swimmers use front crawl regardless).

Medalists

Results

Heats

Three heats were held; the fastest eight teams advanced to the Finals.  The teams that advanced are highlighted.

Heat One

Heat Two

Heat Three

Final

References

Swimming at the 1960 Summer Olympics
4 × 100 metre medley relay
Men's events at the 1960 Summer Olympics